Ermin Seratlić (born 21 August 1990 in Titograd) is a Montenegrin footballer who plays for Mornar Bar.

Playing career

Club
In January 2011, he joined Jagiellonia Białystok on a four-year contract. He left Mladost Lješkopolje in summer 2019 and he later played for FK Rudar Pljevlja, but left them in summer 2020.

International
He was a part of Montenegro national under-21 football team.

References

External links
 
 

1990 births
Living people
Bosniaks of Montenegro
Association football midfielders
Montenegrin footballers
Montenegro under-21 international footballers
OFK Titograd players
Jagiellonia Białystok players
FK Dečić players
FK Radnik Bijeljina players
FK Budućnost Podgorica players
FK Podgorica players
FK Rudar Pljevlja players
FK Mornar players
Montenegrin First League players
Ekstraklasa players
Premier League of Bosnia and Herzegovina players
Montenegrin Second League players
Montenegrin expatriate footballers
Expatriate footballers in Poland
Montenegrin expatriate sportspeople in Poland
Expatriate footballers in Bosnia and Herzegovina
Montenegrin expatriate sportspeople in Bosnia and Herzegovina